Dardagny Castle is a castle in the municipality of Dardagny in the Canton of Geneva in Switzerland.  It is a Swiss heritage site of national significance.

History
During the 13th Century Dardagny Castle, along with Bruel, La Corbière and Malval, formed a ring of castles, which secured the western boundary of the lands of the Bishop of Geneva.  In 1298 there were two castles, which were separated by a small road.  Each one belonged to one of the two noble families in Dardagny.  In the 14th Century, the south building was over two stories high and had a tower.  In 1646, the Favre family inherited, both feudal domains in the village.  Daniel Favre joined the two castles in 1655 through a gallery.  He also built three towers and expanded the entire building.  In 1721 Dardagny Castle went to Jean Vasserot who had the courtyard roofed over and converted into a feast hall which was decorated with Italian paintings.  In 1740 staircase was built in the small central tower and the received its present appearance.  It was purchased in 1904 by the municipality.  They restored it in 1926 and 1932, after initially considering demolishing the building.  Since then, the building has housed local government and a school.

See also
 List of castles and fortresses in Switzerland

References

Cultural property of national significance in the canton of Geneva
Castles in the canton of Geneva